Pesu Mal is a Pakistani politician who had been a Member of the Provincial Assembly of Sindh, from June 2013 to May 2018.

Early life and education
He was born on 3 May 1972 in Jamshoro.

He has done Bachelor of Engineering from Mehran University of Engineering and Technology.

Political career

He was elected to the Provincial Assembly of Sindh as a candidate of Pakistan Peoples Party on reserved seat for minorities in 2013 Pakistani general election.

References

Living people
Sindh MPAs 2013–2018
Pakistan People's Party politicians
1972 births